The 2006 British National Track Championships were a series of track cycling competitions held from 3–7 October 2006 at the Manchester Velodrome. They are organised and sanctioned by British Cycling, and were open to British cyclists.

Medal summary

Men's Events

Women's Events

References

National Track Championships
British National Track Championships